Elizabeth Bridge could refer to:

 Elisabeth Bridge (Budapest), a crossing of the Danube in Hungary 
 Regis R. Malady Bridge, a crossing of the Monongahela in the United States
 Elizabeth Stirling Bridge (1819–1895), British musician